Kent Leonhardt (born April 2, 1954) is the West Virginia Commissioner of Agriculture, having been elected in November 2016, he took office January 2017. He is a member of the United States Republican Party.

Leonhardt is a farmer operating a  farm in western Monongalia County, West Virginia. He raises sheep, cattle, and goats. He formerly served in the West Virginia State Senate for the 2nd district. He is retired from the United States Marine Corps as a lieutenant colonel. He holds a degree in wildlife management from the University of Missouri and an MBA from Central Michigan University.

Electoral history

References

1954 births
21st-century American politicians
Central Michigan University alumni
Farmers from West Virginia
Living people
People from Monongalia County, West Virginia
United States Marine Corps officers
University of Missouri alumni
West Virginia Commissioners of Agriculture
Republican Party West Virginia state senators